Shenqiu County is a county in the east of Henan province, China, bordering Anhui province to the south and east. It is under the administration of Zhoukou City. The county seat is the town of Shenqiu, which is situated on the Ying River, a tributary of the Huai River. This river traverses the county from Zhoukou in the west to the Henan state border with Anhui in the east at Jieshou,

The county includes the two streets, 10 towns, 10 townships. Population is made up of nine (Han, Hui, Manchu, Mongolian, Tibetan, Zhuang,  Daur) ethnic groups. Han ethnic group is the largest comprising more than 956,000 Han.

Administrative divisions
As 2012, this county is divided to 2 subdistricts, 9 towns, 1 ethnic town and 10 townships.
Subdistricts
Dongcheng Subdistrict
Beicheng Subdistrict

Towns

Ethnic Towns
Huaidian Hui Town

Townships

Climate

References

County-level divisions of Henan
Zhoukou